Friederike of Brandenburg-Schwedt (Friederike Sophia Dorothea; 18 December 1736 – 9 March 1798) was Duchess of Württemberg by marriage to Frederick II Eugene, Duke of Württemberg. She is an ancestor to many European royals of the 19th and 20th century.

Biography 
Friederike was a daughter of Margrave Frederick William of Brandenburg-Schwedt and Princess Sophia Dorothea of Prussia. Her mother was a sister of Frederick the Great. Her siblings included Elisabeth Louise, Princess Augustus Ferdinand of Prussia and Philippine, Landgravine of Hesse-Cassel.

On 2 November 1753, she married Frederick Eugen of Württemberg. He would succeed his brother in 1795, making her Duchess consort of Württemberg.

Friederike was described as witty and charming. She belonged to the reformed faith, while her husband was Catholic; however, she brought up her children as Lutheran upon agreement with the Lutheran council, from whom she received an allowance.

From 1769, she lived at Montbéliard, which was being managed by her husband. In 1792, she abandoned Montbéliard because of the French Revolution. Her husband inherited the Dukedom of Württemberg in 1795–1797.

Issue
She had twelve children:

 Duke Frederick Wilhelm Karl of Württemberg (6 November 1754 – 30 October 1816); succeeded his father as Duke of Württemberg; would later become the first King of Württemberg.
 Duke Louis Frederick Alexander of Württemberg (30 August 1756 – 20 September 1817), of whom King Charles III of the United Kingdom is a descendant.
 Duke Eugene Frederick Henry of Württemberg (21 November 1758 – 20 June 1822).
 Duchess Sophie Marie Dorothea of Württemberg (25 October 1759 – 5 November 1828), married to Paul I, Emperor of Russia), of whom Charles III of the United Kingdom and Queen Sofia of Spain are direct descendants.
 Duke William Frederick Philip of Württemberg (27 December 1761 – 10 August 1830); father of Wilhelm, 1st Duke of Urach.
 Duke Ferdinand Frederick Augustus of Württemberg (22 October 1763 – 20 January 1834).
 Duchess Friederike Elisabeth Amalie of Württemberg (27 July 1765 – 24 November 1785), married to Peter, Duke of Oldenburg.
 Duchess Elisabeth Wilhelmine Luise of Württemberg (21 April 1767 – 18 February 1790), married to Francis I, Emperor of Austria.
 Duchess Friederike Wilhelmine Katharina  of Württemberg (3 June 1768 – 22 October 1768).
 Duke Charles Frederick Henry  of Württemberg (3 May 1770 – 22 August 1791).
 Duke Alexander Frederick Charles of Württemberg (24 April 1771 – 4 July 1833), the founder of the fifth branch of Württemberg, from which today's head of the House, Duke Carl Maria of Württemberg.
 Duke Charles Henry of Württemberg (3 July 1772 – 28 July 1833).

Ancestry

Notes

|-

1736 births
1798 deaths
People from Schwedt
People from the Margraviate of Brandenburg
House of Hohenzollern
Duchesses of Württemberg
Margravines of Brandenburg-Schwedt
House of Württemberg
Brandenburgian nobility
German Lutherans
Daughters of monarchs